Children in Need 2008 was a campaign held in the United Kingdom to raise money for Children in Need. It culminated in a live broadcast on BBC One on the evening of Friday 14 November, through to the morning of Saturday 15 November. The broadcast was hosted by Terry Wogan, Fearne Cotton and Tess Daly joined by other guest presenters throughout the night, including Alesha Dixon presenting from BT Tower. The voice-over reading out running totals was Alan Dedicoat. The 2008 event broke all previous records, with a total of £20,991,216 raised by the end of the broadcast.

Television campaign

Artist performances 
 The 2008 show opened with McFly performing "Stay With Me", one of the songs from this year's official Children in Need double A side single, before rushing off to Birmingham, to continue their Radio:ACTIVE tour
 Emma Barton from EastEnders performed "You to Me are Everything"
 Boyzone performed their latest single "Love You Anyway" live from the Belfast Children in Need event
 Duffy performed "Rain on Your Parade" from her album Rockferry
 Leon Jackson gave an exclusive first performance of "Creative" – the second single to be released from his album Right Now
 Girls Aloud performed their Number 1 hit "The Promise" from their album Out of Control
 Take That performed their new single "Greatest Day"
 Sugababes opened the second part of the show with "Girls"
 McFly appeared again to perform the other song from the double A side "Do Ya." This was pre-recorded due to the band leaving early
 Duffy made a second appearance to perform her song "Mercy"
 Alesha Dixon made a second appearance, this time singing "The Boy Does Nothing" from her album The Alesha Show
 One Night Only performed "Just for Tonight"
 Il Divo performed "The Power of Love (La Fuerza Mayor)" from their 2008 album The Promise
 Boyzone made a second appearance to perform "Love Me for a Reason", again live from Belfast
 Will Young performed his new single "Grace" from his album Let It Go
 Stereophonics performed "Have a Nice Day" from their 2001 album Just Enough Education to Perform from the Cardiff event
 John Barrowman performed "What About Us" from his second album Music Music Music
 Jason Donovan performed a cover version of "Be My Baby"
 James Morrison and Keisha Buchanan performed a duet of "Broken Strings", a song he originally recorded with Nelly Furtado
 Russell Watson performed a cover of "Me and Mrs. Jones"
 Sharleen Spiteri performed "All the Times I Cried" from her solo album Melody in Glasgow
 Enya performed "Trains and Winter Rains" from her 2008 album And Winter Came... from Belfast
 Katie Melua performed "The Closest Thing to Crazy" from her first album Call Off the Search
 Revelation, finalists in "Last Choir Standing" and Sharon D. Clarke, one of the judges from the show, performed a cover of "Ain't No Mountain High Enough"

Cast performances 
 The cast of The Bill put together a tribute to The Blues Brothers
 The cast from the 2009 revival of Oliver! performed a medley of songs from the show featuring the winners of I'd Do Anything (shown twice throughout the broadcast, the second time was to replace a scheduled appearance by Razorlight who had to pull out at the last minute due to illness)
 The cast of EastEnders performed a tribute to West End Theatre featuring songs from Moulin Rouge!, My Fair Lady, Saturday Night Fever, Billy Elliot and Mary Poppins (shown twice throughout the broadcast)
 The BBC Newsreaders performed a tribute to ABBA as their 2008 contribution
 A group of BBC presenters (including Blue Peter, Match of the Day, TMi and also ITV's Al Murray) lip synced to "Rockstar"
 The cast of the London production of Hairspray arrived straight from the night's production to perform "You Can't Stop the Beat"
 The crew from DIY SOS performed a cover of "Addicted to Love"

Others 
 Merlin in Need a special 2 minute sketch from Merlin.
 A special junior edition of MasterChef
 A special episode of Strictly Come Dancing with Terry Wogan and Flavia Cacace dancing against regular 'Strictly' presenter Tess Daly who was partnered with Anton Du Beke
 A preview clip from the 2008 Christmas Special of Doctor Who (shown twice throughout the broadcast)
 A special, How to Look Good Naked in Weatherfield, a combination of Coronation Street and How to Look Good Naked (shown twice throughout the broadcast)
 A sketch of The Royle Family sitting watching Children in Need
 Another combination, this time Richard Hammond from Top Gear appeared in a special one off mini episode of Ashes to Ashes (shown twice throughout the broadcast)
 A short sketch of Alex Salmond MSP (Scottish First Minister), portraying Rikki Fulton's Rev I M Jolly. This was only shown in the Scottish region
 WWE wrestler Kofi Kingston and Hardeep Singh Kohli had a match on a WWE video game. This was only shown in the Scottish Region.

QI 
During the customary break for the BBC News at Ten the first episode of the 6th series of QI was screened on BBC Two. The episode had a Children in Need theme. As with previous Children in Need specials, it guest starred Pudsey Bear, David Mitchell and Ronni Ancona, however immediately following the contestant introductions, Terry Wogan appeared to dismiss Pudsey and take his place. Stephen Fry admitted on Twitter that the special was recorded in May or June of this year.

Celebrity Scissorhands 

A third series of Celebrity Scissorhands was shown in the run up to the 2008 event, again featuring celebrity hairdresser Lee Stafford and Steve Strange as lead stylist. The winner was Sabrina Washington with Jeff Leach as the runner up.

Official single 
On 30 October 2008 the BBC announced that the 2008 Children in Need official single would be a double A side of "Do Ya" and a cover of Faces "Stay With Me" by British pop band McFly. The songs were released for download on 23 November and in stores the following day, with all profits raised going to the appeal. The band performed both songs as part of the 2008 broadcast on BBC1. "Do Ya" charted at Number 18 on 30 November 2008, making it the lowest chart entry for a Children in Need song to date.

Other activities 

As in previous years, the TV show Countryfile sold a calendar in aid of the appeal. In 2008, it raised £369,000.

Totals 
The following are totals with the times they were announced on the televised show.

It was announced during the broadcast that since 1980 the appeal had raised over £500,000,000 towards helping children in the UK.

See also 
 Children in Need

References

External links 
 Children in Need website
 

2008 in the United Kingdom
2008 in British television
2008
November 2008 events in the United Kingdom